was a feudal domain under the Tokugawa shogunate of Edo period Japan.  It is located in Shimōsa Province, Honshū. The domain was centered at Koga Castle, located in what is the city of Koga in Ibaraki Prefecture.

History
During the Muromachi period, Koga was the seat of the Kantō kubō, under the Ashikaga clan, who vied with the Uesugi clan and with the Later Hōjō clan for control of eastern Japan. Ashikaga Ujinohime was the last Koga-kubo and owner of Koga domain of the Ashikaga lineage.

When Toyotomi Hideyoshi defeated the Hōjō at the Siege of Odawara, the area fell into his hands, and was subsequently assigned (along with the rest of the Kantō region) to Tokugawa Ieyasu. Ieyasu assigned Koga Castle to his grandson-in-law, Ogasawara Hidemasa as daimyō of Koga Domain, with assessed kokudaka of 30,000 koku.

Afterwards, the domain was reassigned every couple of generations to a large number of fudai daimyō clans, spending the longest time under the control of the Doi clan (1633–1681, 1762–1871).

During the Boshin War, the Tokugawa shogunate ordered the domain to provide guards on the foreign settlement at Yokohama. However, the domain capitulated almost immediately on the approach of the imperial forces. The final daimyō of Koga, Doi Toshitomo, served as domain governor until 1871, and was awarded the title of shishaku (marquis) under the kazoku peerage system. Koga Domain subsequently became part of Ibaraki Prefecture.

Bakumatsu period holdings
As with most domains in the han system, Koga Domain consisted of several discontinuous territories calculated to provide the assigned kokudaka, based on periodic cadastral surveys and projected agricultural yields.
Shimōsa Province
27 villages in Katsushika District
2 villages in Sashima District
Shimotsuke Province
13 villages in Samukawa District (entire district)
68 villages in Tsuga District
2 villages in Aso District
2 villages in Yanada District 
2 villages in Ashikaga District
Settsu Province
5 villages in Nishinari District
4 villages in Sumiyoshi District
9 villages in Shimashimo
5 villages in Yatabe District 
2 villages in Ubara District
Harima Province
6 villages in Mino District
4 villages in Katō
8 villages in Taka District
2 villages in Kasai District 
Mimasaka Province
30 villages in Kumenanjo District

List of daimyōs

See also
List of Han

References
The content of this article was largely derived from that of the corresponding article on Japanese Wikipedia.

External links
 Koga Domain on "Edo 300 HTML"

Notes

Domains of Japan
History of Ibaraki Prefecture
Shimōsa Province
Fujii-Matsudaira clan
Honda clan
Hotta clan
Matsui-Matsudaira clan
Ogasawara clan
Ōkōchi-Matsudaira clan
Okudaira clan
Toda-Matsudaira clan